Tom Lang (born 12 June 1997, in Oxford, England) is a Scottish footballer who plays as a defender for Raith Rovers. Lang, who started his career as a youth player with Birmingham City and Rangers, has previously played with Dumbarton, Stranraer and Dunfermline Athletic.

Career
Lang started his career with Birmingham City before joining Rangers in July 2015. He left Rangers in the summer of 2016 and after trial spells with Dundee United, Barnsley, QPR and Southend United, signed for Dumbarton in January 2017. He left the club in May 2017

He signed for Stranraer on 21 May 2017, however found his opportunities limited playing just six times. In December 2017 it was announced that he was leaving the blues along with Danny Stoney and Ryan Wallace, and joining Scottish League Two side Clyde. Lang made his debut against Annan Athletic in a 0–0 draw at Broadwood. After impressing with the club he signed an extended deal until the end of the 2018–19 season in February 2018.

After achieving promotion through the play-offs, Lang attracted the interest of Scottish Championship club Dunfermline Athletic. On 19 June 2019, he signed a two-year deal with the East End Park side. Lang was loaned back to Clyde in January 2020. After one season and one appearance, Lang left Dunfermline to re-sign for Clyde in October 2020.

Personal life
Lang is the great grandson of Newcastle United's FA Cup winner Tommy Lang.

Career statistics

References

External links

1997 births
Living people
Scottish footballers
Association football defenders
Scotland youth international footballers
Birmingham City F.C. players
Rangers F.C. players
Dumbarton F.C. players
Stranraer F.C. players
Clyde F.C. players
Dunfermline Athletic F.C. players
Scottish Professional Football League players